Money Island is one of the Thimble Islands off Stony Creek, a section of Branford, Connecticut. It is named after a legend that Captain Kidd buried his treasure there. The island, 12 acres (49,000 m2) in size, bears an entire village of 32 houses, a post office, and one library. Former buildings included a school, a church, and a grocery store. There are three roads and several piers. At this time, none of the houses are occupied year-round.

The three roads are Montowese Avenue, Pequot Avenue, and Kidd's Lane.

See also
Thimble Islands
Outer Lands

References
Wealthy Widow Buying Up Thimbles, "New Haven Register", January 22, 2006, page A1
Half a Mile Off the Coast; Stacey Stowe; "In the Region/Connecticut", New York Times, July 30, 2006; Real Estate page 10.

Branford, Connecticut
Thimble Islands
Long Island Sound
Landforms of Middlesex County, Connecticut